The Italian ambassador in Riyadh is the official representative of the Government in Rome to the Government of Saudi Arabia.

List of representatives 
<onlyinclude>

References 

 
Saudi Arabia
Italy